Nils Oskar Nilsson (23 August 1935 – 31 December 2018) was a Swedish politician of the Moderate Party. He was a member of the Riksdag, the Parliament of Sweden, from 2006 to 2010, representing Stockholm County, and served as a replacement member of the Riksdag from 2003–2004.

References

External links 
Riksdagen: Nils Oskar Nilsson (m)

Members of the Riksdag from the Moderate Party
Members of the Riksdag 2006–2010
2018 deaths
1935 births
21st-century Swedish politicians